Lockyer railway station is a closed railway station on the Main Line railway in Queensland, Australia. It served the locality of Lockyer in the Lockyer Valley Region.

Description 
The station building has been relocated to Murphy Creek Grounds in Murphys Creek.

References

Disused railway stations in Queensland
Main Line railway, Queensland
Lockyer Valley Region